Tambovsky District is the name of several administrative and municipal districts in Russia:
Tambovsky District, Amur Oblast, an administrative and municipal district of Amur Oblast
Tambovsky District, Tambov Oblast, an administrative and municipal district of Tambov Oblast

See also
Tambovsky (disambiguation)

References